Serebryany Bor (lit. silver forest) is an urban locality (an urban-type settlement) in Neryungrinsky District of the Sakha Republic, Russia, located  from Neryungri, the administrative center of the district, on the Amur–Yakutsk Mainline, in the Aldan Highlands. As of the 2010 Census, its population was 4,163.

History
It was founded due to the construction of the Neryungrinsky GRES coal-fired power plant. Urban-type settlement status was granted in 1978.

Administrative and municipal status
Within the framework of administrative divisions, the urban-type settlement of Serebryany Bor is incorporated within Neryungrinsky District as the Settlement of Serebryany Bor. As a municipal division, the Settlement of Serebryany Bor is incorporated within Neryungrinsky Municipal District as Serebryany Bor Urban Settlement.

Economy
Immediately to the east of the settlement, the Olongoro River (a tributary of the Aldan) is dammed to create a reservoir, providing water for the local thermal power plant. The plant is the principal employer of the local population.

Transportation
A spur from the Amur–Yakutsk Mainline railway brings coal from the open-cut mine north-west of Neryungri. The Lena Highway to Yakutsk also runs by.

References

Notes

Sources
Official website of the Sakha Republic. Registry of the Administrative-Territorial Divisions of the Sakha Republic. Neryungrinsky District. 

Urban-type settlements in the Sakha Republic